The Wairahi River is a river of New Zealand's Great Barrier Island. It is the only river (so named) on the island — the island's other watercourses all having names ending is "stream". The Wairahi flows generally west, roughly paralleling the island's long southwestern shore, from its origins north of Whangaparapara Harbour. A walking track from Whangaparapara to Port Fitzroy follows the river for part of its length.

See also
List of rivers of New Zealand

References

Great Barrier Island
Rivers of the Auckland Region
Hauraki Gulf catchment